Kaho is a feminine Japanese name written in different kanji characters and having different meanings:
花歩, "flower, walk/progress"
花穂, "flower, ear (of grain)"
果歩, "fruit, walk/progress"
香穂, "incense, ear (of grain)"
夏帆, "summer, sail"
夏穂, "summer, ear (of grain)"
嘉穂, "praise, ear (of grain)"
加保, "add, protect"
歌歩, "song, walk/progress"

The name can also be written in hiragana or katakana.

People with the name
Kaho (actress) (夏帆), a Japanese actress and fashion model
, Japanese professional wrestler
Kaho Kōda (夏穂), a Japanese voice actress
Kaho Minami (果歩), a Japanese actress
Kaho Miyasaka (香帆), a Japanese manga artist
Kaho Shibuya (果歩), a Japanese media personality
Kaho Shimada (歌穂), a Japanese singer and musical theater actress
, Japanese ice hockey player

Fictional characters
Kaho Mizuki (歌帆), a character in the anime and manga series Cardcaptor Sakura
Kaho Serizawa (香穂), the heroine of the Japanese visual novel Hourglass of Summer
Kaho Mikami (歌歩), a character in the anime and manga series World Trigger
Kaho Hinata (日向夏帆), a character in the anime and manga series Blend S

Japanese feminine given names